Morteza Bank is an Iranian politician who currently serves as deputy to Chief of Staff of the President of Iran. He was formerly administrative and financial deputy to minister of foreign affairs and governor of Kerman Province.

References 

Living people
Iranian Vice Ministers
Iranian diplomats
Moderation and Development Party politicians
Governors of Kerman Province
Year of birth missing (living people)